Philippe Lemaire (14 March 1927 – 15 March 2004) was a French actor. He appeared in more than ninety films between 1946 and 2004. 

Lemaire was married three times; Nicole Pinton (1949–1951) (divorced); Juliette Gréco from 1953 to 1956, had one daughter, Laurence-Marie Lemaire (1954–2016); and to Claude Bouton (1959–1980) (divorced).  He committed suicide one day after his 77th birthday.

Filmography

References

External links 
 

1927 births
2004 deaths
Suicides by train
People from Seine-et-Marne
French male film actors
French male stage actors
French male television actors
20th-century French male actors
2004 suicides
Suicides in France